Sébastien Epiney (born 29 August 1967 in Paris) is a Swiss ski mountaineer and long distance runner. Epiney started ski mountaineering in 2001.

Selected results

Ski mountaineering 
 2004:
 1st, Patrouille de la Maya A-course, together with Jean-Daniel Masserey and Jean-Yves Rey
 3rd, Trophée des Gastlosen, together with Pius Schuwey
 3rd, World Championship vertical race
 4th, World Championship team race (together with Jean-Yves Rey)
 2005:
 1st, Swiss Championship
 2006:
 5th, World Championship vertical race
 2nd, Trophée des Gastlosen, together with Didier Moret
 2007:
 4th, European Championship vertical race
 2008:
 1st, Swiss Championship
 7th, World Championship vertical race
 2009:
 10th, European Championship vertical race
 2010:
 1st, Zermatt-Rothorn run

Mountain running 
 2004: 3rd, Matterhorn run
 2005: 1st, Matterhorn run
 2008: 1st (veterans 1) and course record, Jeizibärg-Lauf, Gampel

External links 
 Sébastien Epiney at skimountaineering.com
 Personal website

References 

1967 births
Living people
Swiss male ski mountaineers
Swiss male long-distance runners
Swiss mountain runners